Joel Cook Squires (December 11, 1819March 3, 1889) was an American carpenter, miner, Wisconsin pioneer, and Democratic politician.  He was elected as the 3rd Bank Comptroller of Wisconsin, and also served in the Wisconsin State Senate and Assembly, representing Grant County.

Background
Squires was born in Vienna Township, Ohio, on December 11, 1819, and attended the public schools. He came to Wisconsin in 1838 and settled in the Platteville area in 1841. He died at his home in Platteville on March 3, 1889.

Public service
Squires was Clerk of the Grant County Board of Supervisors for 1849, 1850 and 1851; he was Clerk of the Circuit Court in 1851 and 1852. At that time a resident of Lancaster, Squires was elected to the State Senate from the Sixth District for the 1852 session. Squires, a Democrat, succeeded Whig John H. Rountree. At the time of election, he was 31 years of age and had been in Wisconsin for twelve years; he listed his occupation as "carpenter".

After the Senate was re-apportioned and the Sixth District was shifted from the region around Platteville and the surrounding region to the Milwaukee area, Squires was succeeded by fellow Democrat Duncan Reed in the Sixth District, but was elected to the succeeding one-year term in the new Sixteenth District. On May 1, 1853, he resigned from the Senate; fellow Democrat James Wilson Seaton of Potosi was elected to fill his seat.

He served as Register of the United States Land Office at Mineral Point, from 1853 to 1857, until he was elected the State of Wisconsin's Bank Comptroller (at that time an elected position), serving through the end of 1859. He sought re-election in 1860, but was defeated by Republican Gysbert Van Steenwyk Sr.

In the Assembly
In 1870, now living in Platteville and working as a miner, he was elected for a single year term from the first Grant County Assembly district (the Towns of Hazel Green, Smeltzer and Platteville), succeeding Republican Joseph Harris. He received 465 votes to 437 for
Republican William E. Carter (Harris was not a candidate). He ran for re-election in 1871, but lost to Harris by 295 votes to 567 for Harris.

Electoral history

Wisconsin Bank Comptroller (1857, 1859)

| colspan="6" style="text-align:center;background-color: #e9e9e9;"| General Election, November 3, 1857

| colspan="6" style="text-align:center;background-color: #e9e9e9;"| General Election, November 8, 1859

Wisconsin Assembly (1869, 1870)

| colspan="6" style="text-align:center;background-color: #e9e9e9;"| General Election, November 2, 1869

| colspan="6" style="text-align:center;background-color: #e9e9e9;"| General Election, November 8, 1870

References

American carpenters
Democratic Party members of the Wisconsin State Assembly
American miners
Democratic Party Wisconsin state senators
People from Platteville, Wisconsin
People from Vienna Township, Trumbull County, Ohio
1819 births
1889 deaths
19th-century American politicians